Halilu (also Romanized as Halīlū and Haliloo) is a village in Dikleh Rural District, Hurand District, Ahar County, East Azerbaijan Province, Iran. At the 2006 census, its population was 163, in 34 families.

References 

Populated places in Ahar County